Truncatellinidae is a family of minute, air-breathing land snails, terrestrial pulmonate gastropod molluscs or micromollusks in the superfamily Chondrinoidea.

Genera
 Columella Westerlund, 1878
 Negulus O. Boettger, 1889
 Truncatellina R. T. Lowe, 1852
Genera brought into synonymy
 Edentulina Clessin, 1876: synonym of Columella Westerlund, 1878
 Franzia Blume, 1965: synonym of Truncatellina R. T. Lowe, 1852 (junior primary homonym of Franzia Jordan & Thompson, 1914)
 Laurinella P. Hesse, 1915: synonym of Truncatellina R. T. Lowe, 1852
  Paludinella R. T. Lowe, 1852: synonym of Columella Westerlund, 1878

References

 Bank, R. A. (2017). Classification of the Recent terrestrial Gastropoda of the World. Last update: July 16th, 2017.

 
Gastropod families